is a Japanese actress and voice actress from Adachi, Tokyo. She is affiliated with HeaT.

Biography

Filmography

Anime
Turn A Gundam (1999) – Lily Borjano
Overman King Gainer (2002) –  Sara Kodama
Inuyasha (2004) –  The Infant, Hakudoshi
Ergo Proxy (2006) -  Mayahuel
Detroit Metal City (2008) – Death Records President
Inuyasha: The Final Act (2009) – Hakudoshi
Majin Bone (2014) – Anna
Delicious Party Pretty Cure (2022) - Tsurune Hanamichi

Films
Cowboy Bebop: Knockin' on Heaven's Door (2001) – Electra
Crayon Shin-chan: The Storm Called: The Adult Empire Strikes Back (2001) – Chaco
Crayon Shin-chan: The Storm Called: The Battle of the Warring States (2002) – Kasuga Ren
Turn A Gundam I: Earth Light (2002) – Lily Borjano
Turn A Gundam II: Moonlight Butterfly (2002) – Lily Borjano
Appleseed (2004) – Deunan Knute

Video games
Metroid: Other M (2010) – Samus Aran

Dubbing
Bad Boys for Life (2020) – Megan Burnett (Bianca Bethune)
All of Us Are Dead (2022) – Cheong-san's mother (Lee Ji-hyun)

References

External links
 Official agency profile 

1973 births
Living people
Japanese video game actresses
Japanese voice actresses
Voice actresses from Tokyo Metropolis